The women's 800 metre freestyle swimming competition at the 2002 Asian Games in Busan was held on 5 October at the Sajik Swimming Pool. This was a timed-final event, meaning that each swimmer only swam once, with the fastest eight (8) entrants swimming in the finals.

Schedule
All times are Korea Standard Time (UTC+09:00)

Records

Results

References 

2002 Asian Games Report, Pages 214–215
Results

Swimming at the 2002 Asian Games